The Victoria HarbourCats are a summer-collegiate baseball team located in Victoria, British Columbia. The HarbourCats play in the West Coast League (WCL), a collegiate summer baseball league. The team's home games are played at Victoria's Royal Athletic Park.

The HarbourCats were founded in 2012 as an expansion team. On October 12, 2012, the team announced it would be called the HarbourCats after a public naming contest was held that received more than 600 submissions.

History

2013
The Victoria HarbourCats entered the league with play in the 2013 season and went 22–32, missing the playoffs.  A total of 38,793 fans attended home games.

2014
The Victoria HarbourCats went 25–29 in their 2nd season of play in the WCL. Victoria set the record for the most at-bats by a whole team having 1937 at bats in just one season. Victoria drew 45,571 fans through the gates in 30 home games, averaging about 1,576 fans a night. This put Victoria first in WCL attendance in the 2014 season.

2015
The HarbourCats went 29–24 in their 3rd season of play in the WCL. Victoria led the league with a team total of 36 home runs on the season. Victoria drew 49,647 fans through the gates in 26 home games, averaging 1,910 fans a night, a mark which led the West Coast League in attendance for the second straight season.

2016
The HarbourCats set a WCL record for wins in a single season, finishing with a 40-14 regular season mark.  They won the WCL's North Division First Half Pennant with a 23–4 record, qualifying for the playoffs for the first time in franchise history, and the first time for a Victoria-based baseball team since 1954. The pennant was clinched in Victoria on June 30 in front of a WCL-record crowd of 5,133.  Between June 5 and July 1, the team won a WCL-record 19 consecutive games. Attendance increased for the fourth straight year to an average of 2,239 per game, which ranked ninth in North America among summer league clubs.

2017
The HarbourCats finished 29-25 and reached the playoffs for the second consecutive season, winning the WCL's North Division Second Half Pennant on the season's final day. They would go on to win the franchise's first-ever playoff game and series over the Kelowna Falcons, qualifying for their first-ever WCL Championship Series, where they would fall in three games to the Corvallis Knights.

2018
The HarbourCats finished 27-27 and failed to reach the playoffs.  With an attendance of 3,076 at their final home game, the HarbourCats beat their own WCL attendance regular-season attendance of 60,466, by welcoming a total of 62,599 fans through the gates of Wilson's Group Stadium in 2018.

2019
The HarbourCats 2019 regular season, their seventh, began in June 2019.  On July 7, 2019, the team qualified for the playoffs, their third playoff appearance in franchise history.  The team beat the Wenatchee AppleSox 2–1 in games in the northern division series, and advanced to the WCL championship final series versus the Corvallis Knights, but lost that series 2–1 in games.

2020
The HarbourCats 2020 regular season, their eighth, was scheduled to begin at home on June 5, 2020. The worldwide COVID-19 crisis forced the cancellation of the 2020 WCL season.

Ownership

Founder and original owner John McLean, who had changed GMs with Holly Jones leaving and Jim Swanson coming in, would lose the team in a civil claim, part of a larger lawsuit involving his other interests, in BC Supreme Court in the Fall 2014, taken over by the Bhootan Group, led by Matthew Stoudt. Bhootan would then sell the team to local ownership led by John Wilson, Jim Swanson, Ken Swanson and Rich Harder, who took care of local debts.

In February 2019, team ownership announced plans to operate an additional WCL team in the Nanaimo market, playing out of Serauxmen Stadium, in  2021.  Lights and other stadium upgrades are expected to be completed before the new team can play.

Notable alumni 
On April 30, 2017, Nick Pivetta became the first former HarbourCats player to reach the major leagues when the right-hander started for the Philadelphia Phillies against the Washington Nationals.  Following 2017, 40 HarbourCats players have been selected in the MLB draft.  As of 2017, 14 were playing in an MLB team's organization. In the early part of the 2021 season, two former HarbourCats made their debuts - Alex De Goti for the Houston Astros and Andrew Vaughn for the Chicago White Sox.

References

External links
Official website

Amateur baseball teams in Canada
Baseball teams in British Columbia
HarbourCats
Baseball teams established in 2012
2012 establishments in British Columbia